Vasmeh Jan (also Romanized as Vasmeh Jān; also known as Vasmjān and Vasmjān-e Pā’īn) is a village in Pir Kuh Rural District, Deylaman District, Siahkal County, Gilan Province, Iran. At the 2006 census, its population was 106, in 33 families.

References 

Populated places in Siahkal County